Big One, or The Big One may refer to:

Disasters
 The Big One (earthquake), describing an anticipated megathrust earthquake along Western North America or Japan

Films, stories and popular culture
 The Big One (film), a 1998 film by Michael Moore
 The Big One, a 2005 film starring Yangzom Brauen
 The Big One: the Story of TGR's 16 Years in Jackson Hole, a 2006 ski documentary by Teton Gravity Research
 The Big One (TV series), an early-1990s comedy series starring Sandi Toksvig and Mike McShane
 "The Big One" (Gilmore Girls), a third-season episode of the television series Gilmore Girls
 "The Big One" (Dexter), a 2010 episode of the television series Dexter
 The Big One: The Great Los Angeles Earthquake, a 1990 made-for-television movie starring Joanna Kerns, depicting a massive earthquake that destroys Los Angeles, California
 Sōkichi Bamba/Big One, a fictional character in J.A.K.Q. Dengekitai
 "The Big One", the fake heart attack that Redd Foxx would regularly have on the television series Sanford and Son
 Big One, a locomotive from the anime series The Galaxy Railways
 The Big One (roller coaster), a roller coaster in Blackpool Pleasure Beach 
 "The Big One", the nickname given to Red Nose Day 2007, a fundraising event held in the UK organised by Comic Relief
 "The Big One", a slogan used by WLW 700 AM, a radio station in Cincinnati, Ohio
 The Big One (NASCAR), phrase describing any crash usually involving five or more cars in NASCAR and ARCA stock car racing
 Big One for One Drop, a poker tournament featuring the largest buy-in events
 ”The Big One”, nickname of the Big Score, the final heist mission in Grand Theft Auto V.

Global conflicts
 “The Big One” — World War II

Music

Albums
 The Big One (Daddy Freddy album), a 1994 album by ragga vocalist Daddy Freddy
 Big Ones (Aerosmith album), a 1994 compilation album by Aerosmith
 Big Ones (Loverboy album), a 1989 compilation album by Loverboy

Songs
"Big One", single by Judge Dread, Lemon, Hughes 1973
 "The Big One" (song), a 1994 song by George Strait
 "The Big One", a song by Nellie McKay from her album Pretty Little Head
 "The Big One", a 1998 single by Confederate Railroad
 "The Big One", an instrumental theme by Alan Tew used in The People's Court TV show

See also
 Little One (disambiguation)
 Big Two (disambiguation)
 Big Three (disambiguation)
 Big Four (disambiguation)
 Big Five (disambiguation)
 Big Six (disambiguation)
 Big Seven (disambiguation)
 Big Eight (disambiguation)
 Big Ten (disambiguation)
 Big 12